The coat of arms of the city of Prague, the capital of the Czech Republic, has a lesser and a greater version.

The coat of arms was first introduced in the 15th century (when the city of Prague corresponded to what is now the Old Town district). It consisted of three silver towers on a red shield. The coat of arms was improved by Frederick III in 1462, in recognition of the service of king George of Poděbrady, by replacing the silver tincture by gold.
The full coat of arms in this period showed an imperial crown in the crest and two Bohemian lions as supporters.

In 1649, after the Thirty Years' War, Ferdinand III added an armour arm in silver holding a silver sword emerging from the city gate. This symbol represents the effective defense of the city against the Swedish army during the Thirty Years war. Ferdinand also added a crest showing the Habsburg eagle and his monogram FIII.

The coat of arms was inherited by the modern city of Prague upon its  formation in 1784, when the four boroughs (Old Town, New Town, Hradčany and Lesser Town were unified. 
The Habsburg eagle in the crest was replaced by a third Bohemian lion in 1918, and the motto Praha matka měst ("Prague, the mother of cities") was added. During the communist period, the lion in the crest was shown with a red five-pointed star instead of a crown.
The current version of the greater coat of arms, designed by Karel Pánek, was adopted in 1991. It restored the crown of the Bohemian lion in the crest and changed the motto to 
PRAGA CAPUT REI PUBLICAE ("Prague, the Capital of the Republic").

The number of bricks shown corresponds to the number of cadastral subdivisions of Prague, currently 112.

Previous versions

See also

History of Prague

References

1649 introductions
1991 introductions
Prague
Culture in Prague
History of Prague